Shemaroo Entertainment Ltd. is an Indian content creator, aggregator and distributor, specifically in the media and entertainment industry. It was founded by Buddhichand Maroo in 1962 as a book circulating library under the name Shemaroo. It set up India's first video rental business in 1979. The company went national after it began content distribution in 1987, became aggregators and bought rights to movies for home video.

Currently, the brand has a collection of over 3700 movie titles in multiple Indian languages, and offers services to customers in over 30 countries including the US, the UK, Singapore, UAE and Australia.

The company's partners for content distribution include Amazon Prime Video, Netflix, YouTube, iTunes, Reliance Jio, Vodafone, Tata Sky, Dd free dish and DishTV (through one of its active service channels 'Evergreen Classics Active'). Shemaroo has offices in Mumbai, New Delhi and New Jersey.

History

Early years 
Shemaroo Entertainment Ltd. was founded on 29 October 1962 as a book circulating library by the Maroo brothers (Buddhichand, Atul and Raman) in collaboration with Gangajibhai Shethias. The name of the company is an acronym of the founders’ surnames. The library was located at Warden Road of South Mumbai. Three branches were opened soon after.

In 1979, they expanded to include video home system (VHS) tapes in their collection by partnering with affluent business families who had their personal collections of movies.

In 1987, the company forayed into content distribution via the VHS format, which was labeled Shemaroo Video Private Ltd. They also bought rights to several movies for home video and were one of the first brands involved in the distribution of video rights in India.

Shemaroo started buying cable and pay television rights in the 1990s. In 1995, the company bought an equity stake in Sony's Indian TV channel while negotiating a deal to buy films of Sony's Columbia Tristar.

2000s to present 
Shemaroo became an integrated content media house with the commencement of Digital Post Production Facilities. The company ventured into film production with movies like Kuch Meetha Ho Jaye, Omkara, Ishqiya, Dedh Ishqiya and Hunterrr. These were followed by several others in the subsequent years.

The company forayed into digital animated films with Bal Ganesh and Ghatothkach as their initial features, and became the only company to release a feature every year thereafter.

The brand also owns an online retro music channel, Filmi Gaane, which offers classic Bollywood songs from the 1950s to the 1990s.

In 2012, Shemaroo completed 50 years of operations. In 2018, the company unveiled a new logo and tagline ‘India Khush Hua’.

In January 2020, Shemaroo Group launched its first TV channel named as Shemaroo Marathibana. It is a 24 hour FTA Marathi movie channel with the tagline 'Assal Filmi' (translated as 'Made for Entertainment').The channel receives good TRP. Swapnil Joshi is its brand Ambassador. It airs Marathi superhit movies like Aapla Manus, Thackeray, Bhai Vyakti Ki Valli, Judgement, Cycle and Ani Dr. Kashinath Ghanekar, etc. The free-to-air channel focuses entirely on Marathi audiences across Maharashtra and Goa, and addresses their preferences through its catalog of over 200 titles.

In 2020, Shemaroo Group announced the launch of a new Hindi GEC Shemaroo TV. A free-to-air channel, Shemaroo TV targets the Hindi-speaking markets of India with the tagline 'Badalte Aaj Ke Liye.'

Shemaroo Pre-loaded audio speakers

In 2019, the company ventured into the pre-loaded audio speaker market and introduced Bluetooth speakers loaded with devotional content.
The pricing for all three existing products in store (online & offline) – Bhagavad Gita, Bhajan Vaani and Quran Majeed And is available in the market currently with leading offline and online retailers.

In 2019, Shemaroo launched 'Shemaroo Bhakti Shri Ganesha Bhajan Vaani' during Ganesh Chaturthi, and 'Shemaroo Amritbani' on the 550th birth anniversary of Shri Guru Nanak Dev Ji

Business operations 
Shemaroo's content library includes over 3,700 film and non-film titles. These include classic Bollywood movies such as Anari, Jab Jab Phool Khile, Neel Kamal, Amar Akbar Anthony, Dharam Veer, Roti, Khuda Gawah, Dil, Deewana, Beta, Hum Hain Rahi Pyar Ke, Khakee, 3 Deewarein and Chupke Chupke; more recent films such as Jab We Met, Ishqiya, Slumdog Millionaire, Ajab Prem Ki Ghazab Kahani, Omkara, Judwaa 2, Padmaavat, Pad Man, 102 Not Out, Ishk Vishk and Soldier; and animated features like Bal Ganesh and Ghatothkach.

They also include movies classic nataks in several Indian regional languages like Gujarati, Marathi, Punjabi and Bengali, such as Chhelo Divas, Passport, Gujjubhai Banya Dabang and Thai Jaishe .

They also provide substantial content in the devotional spectrum with devotional videos, live streaming of shrines, temples and more in categories such as Bhakti, Ibaadat and Gurbani via their apps Ibaadat and Hari Om.

Their distribution network includes an in-house television syndication team, a new media technology team for mobile value added services (MVAS), the Internet, DTH and a nationwide home entertainment distribution network. The company has partnered with Airtel, Vodafone, Idea, MTN, Ooredoo and Etisalat to distribute content like videos, music and live streaming via MVAS. They also have an online presence on YouTube, where their channels receive an estimated 2.2 billion monthly views on an average.

Their partners include major DTH platforms such as Airtel digital TV, Tata Sky and Dish TV, and channels such as Sony, Star India and Colors. The company's subsidiary Contentino Media provides in-flight entertainment for airlines like Emirates, Singapore Airlines, Qatar Airways, Air India, Vistara, Lufthansa and Virgin Atlantic.

The company's brand Yedaz is the official Bollywood licensing and merchandising rights holder that sells Bollywood themed products like T-shirts and mugs. They also established the Shemaroo Institute of Film and Technology (SIFT) for students wishing to work in the film industry.

ShemarooMe 

In February 2019, Shemaroo Entertainment launched its own video-on-demand service app called ShemarooMe, which is available for Android and iOS. It is also available on the web for viewers. The Bollywood actor Tiger Shroff was present at the launch event of this app in Mumbai.

The OTT video streaming service primarily provides content from the company's content library including movies, TV shows and songs pertaining to Bollywood classics, contemporary Bollywood, premium Gujarati, the kids category, etc. The content is available in languages like Gujarati, Marathi and Punjabi. More such vernacular languages are expected to be added in the future versions of the app.

The service follows a freemium business model. Some of the content will be available for users to stream for free, and the rest shall require a subscription to be accessed.

It has also been launched in the USA (in April 2019).

In September 2019, ShemarooMe introduced a new property called Shemaroo Bollywood Premiere – Premieres One World Digital Premier every week movies every Friday 

ShemarooMe announced the launch of its new genre Comedy.

ShemarooMe went global with a presence in 150 markets along with the US, UK, Middle Eastern and South Asian markets.

In July 2020, ShemarooMe announced the launch of its new on-demand movie platform called 'ShemarooMe Box Office.' ShemarooMe has also inked a strategic partnership with BookMyShow, India's leading entertainment destination, to ensure more cine-goers have access to the content.

TV Channels

Upcoming Channels 
 Shemaroo Kids
 Shemaroo Movies
 Shemaroo Filmi Gaane

Awards 
In May 2009, they won the "Golden Cursor Awards 2009" for their direct-to-DVD edutainment film Rhyme Time in Toyland and for their mobile game Ghatothkach: Eat on Before Dawn.

In June 2011, they won 13 awards for their DVDs out of the total 20 awards at the 'DVD Awards for Indian Home Video DVD releases 2011'.

In April 2016, they won the 'National Awards for Excellence in Digital and Social Media Marketing 2016' for their online campaign for a cricket tournament, Comedy Premier League. In September 2016, Shemaroo entered Limca Book of Records twice for the ‘Longest Digital Antakshri’ and ‘Most Tweets in a Day’ for the campaign #FilmiGaaneAntakshari.

In March 2018, they won the "DIGIXX Awards 2018" for their Filmi Gaane campaign #KuchKisseKuchKahaniyan. In August 2018, they won the "DIGIXX Awards 2018" for sponsorship and partnership marketing between Yedaz and the social platforms Vigo Video and TikTok. In December 2018, the company's Shemaroo Bhakti App won the "Innovative Mobile App Award 2018" at the Drivers of Digital Summit 2018.

Controversy 
In May 2020, a video surfaced where the comedian Surleen Kaur appeared to remark about Krishna, a Hindu deity, which right-leaning media houses and political parties objected to. Following the controversy, Shemaroo announced their decision to refrain from any further involvement with Surleen Kaur and Balraj Syal because they ‘failed to meet their standards of public decency’. Subsequently, ISKCON lodged a complaint against Kaur and Shemaroo with the Mumbai Police for insulting the organisation and Hindus.

References

External links 
 
ShemarooMe

Film distributors of India
Hindi cinema
Home video distributors
Film production companies based in Mumbai
Entertainment companies established in 1962